"Heavenly Bodies" is a song written by Elaine Lifton, Gloria Nissenson and Lee Ritenour, and recorded by American country music artist Earl Thomas Conley.  It was released in May 1982 as the first single from the album Somewhere Between Right and Wrong.  The song reached #8 on the Billboard Hot Country Singles & Tracks chart.

Critical reception
Kip Kirby of Billboard magazine reviewed the song favorably, saying that the tune "lives up to his own imagery" even though he didn't write it. He goes on to say that the "clean, easy-tempo arrangement leaves proper space for hearing the singer's thoughtful comparison of a woman to astral attractions."

Chart performance

References

1982 singles
1982 songs
Earl Thomas Conley songs
RCA Records singles
Songs written by Lee Ritenour